"Go West Young Man" is an episode of the BBC sitcom, Only Fools and Horses. It was the second episode of series 1, and was first screened on 15 September 1981. This was the lowest rated episode of the entire series, with only 6.1 million viewers. In the episode, Del sells a faulty car to an Australian man.

Synopsis
Rodney is unhappy, since his friend Mickey Pearce has stolen his latest girlfriend, Monica. Del Boy on the other hand is happy as he lays down his latest idea of where the future of Trotter's Independent Traders lies to Rodney and Grandad. He suggests they enter the second-hand car trade. Del buys an old Ford Cortina for £25 from Boycie's used car lot, while also agreeing to store a Jaguar E-Type in their garage for a week, which Boycie has bought for his "bit on the side" and wishes to hide from his wife.

When driving back to Nelson Mandela House, Rodney discovers that the Cortina is a "death trap" due to many faults, particularly its brakes. The next day, Del sells the Cortina to an Australian man for £199, which Rodney is uncomfortable with due to the car's unsafe condition. That night, Rodney decides to go out on the town and forget about Monica. He asks Del to go with him, but Del says he will only go with him if he has no one else to go with. Rodney instantly dismisses this by claiming that he has several friends who are ravers, although Del is not convinced. After some intense persuasion, Del agrees to join Rodney, taking Boycie's Jaguar.

The brothers visit a nightclub but because it is still early evening, it is quiet. Del questions how many times Rodney has gone to the club, as he told him that it was one of his regular clubs; it transpires Rodney has never been to the club. After having trouble ordering drinks from the waiter, Rodney tells Del about his "women in uniforms" fantasy, to which Del accuses Rodney of being a pervert. Rodney then notices two women at the bar but as Del charms them, it transpires they are a pair of cross-dressers. Realising that they are in a gay club, Del and Rodney abruptly leave.

Later that night, at another nightclub, they meet two beautiful women named Nicki and Michelle. Del lies about Rodney being an international tennis player, christened "Hot Rod" by the press, who faced "Jimmy Conelley" (Jimmy Connors, whom Del states was knocked out in the first round by Rodney) in the final of the (indoors) Miami Open. Despite this, they are able to persuade the two ladies to write their telephone numbers on Del's cigar pack, with the promise of a date next Friday.

On their way home, Rodney unwittingly throws the cigar pack out of the car, and when Del stops to retrieve it they are rear-ended by another car. Del and Rodney get out of the car to investigate, and discover the other car is the Cortina driven by the Australian man, who gets out and angrily chases the Trotters up the street.

Episode cast

Nick Stringer also appeared in another episode of Only Fools and Horses five years later, this time playing a different character. He played Del's old friend and business partner Jumbo Mills in the fifth series finale "Who Wants to be a Millionaire?". He also appeared alongside David Jason in Open All Hours.

First appearances
John Challis as Boycie

Music
Enigma: "Ain't No Stopping"

Ronnie Hazlehurst: Original Theme Tune

Note: In the original series 1 broadcasts of Only Fools and Horses, the theme tune was very different to the version adopted from series 2, which became the standard version known today. Composed by Ronnie Hazlehurst, the original theme tune was a jazzy instrumental tune that played over the start and end credits. This tune was replaced in series 2 with a version written and sung by John Sullivan. After the initial run of series 1, all future re-runs replaced the Hazlehurst version with John Sullivan's to match the other series. The VHS/DVD versions all contain John Sullivan's version, and recordings with Hazlehurst's original tune are extremely rare, though it can be heard in a scene during episode 1 of the first series.

References

External links

1981 British television episodes
British LGBT-related television episodes
Only Fools and Horses (series 1) episodes